David John Greenslade (born 18 January 1943) is an English composer and keyboard player. He has played with Colosseum from the beginning in 1968 until the farewell concert in 2015 and also from 1973 in his own band, Greenslade, and others including If and Chris Farlowe's Thunderbirds. 

Greenslade was born in Woking, Surrey, England, the son of orchestral arranger Arthur Greenslade. Among his works are Cactus Choir, The Pentateuch of the Cosmogony (with art by Patrick Woodroffe) and From the Discworld. Television work includes music for the BBC series Gangsters (1975–1978), Bird of Prey (1982–1984) and A Very Peculiar Practice (1986).

After this he "virtually vanished from sight", becoming, as his friend Terry Pratchett proclaimed, "the man every TV producer in England would call when a new TV theme was needed". Greenslade's association with Pratchett, brought him back out into public view, with the 1994 release of From the Discworld, an album of music inspired by Pratchett's novels. Greenslade was active, between 1994 and 2015, after the re-forming of the band  Colosseum.

Two more solo albums appeared, Going South and Routes/Roots, in 1999 and 2011 respectively.

Albums

Colosseum
 Those Who Are About to Die Salute You (1969)
 Valentyne Suite (1969)
 Daughter of Time (1970)
 Colosseum Live (1971)
 LiveS  The Reunion Concerts 1994 – (1995)
 Live Cologne 1994 – (2003)
 Live05 – (2007)
 Bread & Circuses – (1997)
 Tomorrow's Blues – (2003)
 Time On Our Side (2014)

Greenslade
 Greenslade (1973)
 Bedside Manners Are Extra (1973)
 Spyglass Guest (1974)
 Time and Tide (1975)
 Live
 Large Afternoon (2000)
 Greenslade 2001 - Live the Full Edition (2002)

Solo
 Cactus Choir (1976)
 The Pentateuch of the Cosmogony (1979)
 From the Discworld (1994)
 Going South (1999)
 Routes/Roots (2011)

References

Notes

Other sources
 Vernon Joynson (2014), The Tapestry of Delights - The Comprehensive Guide to British Music of the Beat, R&B, Psychedelic and Progressive Eras 1963-1976, Borderline Productions,

External links
Gibraltar Encyc. of Prog. Rock
Prog Archives bio
Gitlin site
Mystic Records page

1943 births
Living people
People from Woking
English keyboardists
English electronic musicians
British rhythm and blues boom musicians
Colosseum (band) members
If (band) members
Greenslade members